Sara Antunes (born 23 May 1975) is a Portuguese former sports shooter. She competed in two events at the 1996 Summer Olympics.

References

External links
 

1975 births
Living people
Portuguese female sport shooters
Olympic shooters of Portugal
Shooters at the 1996 Summer Olympics
Sportspeople from Cascais